(also known as The Ocean Hunter: The Seven Seas Adventure) is a 1998 shooting gallery game developed and published by Sega. The Ocean Hunter runs on Sega Model 3 hardware. The cabinet features artistic renditions of the bosses of the game, some with faux Greek names: Οχτοπυσ (actual Greek would be Όκτώπους); Λεϖιατηαν (actual Greek would be Λευιαθάν) and Χψχλοπσ (actual Greek would be Κύκλωψ).

Plot
A new civilization is flourishing in the seas of an alternate steampunk world, but giant ocean monsters are attacking shipping vessels, harbors, humans and native marine life with increasing frequency. Ordinary marine predators such as sharks have begun to follow in the sea monsters' wake to scavenge what they could from the destruction caused. Frightened for their lives, the people issue bounties on the monsters' heads. The underwater adventurers Torel (Player 1) and Chris (Player 2) head out to defeat the horrible creatures.

The Seven Seas in-game are listed as:
 Baroque Sea (Pacific Ocean); boss Kraken; reward 5,000;
 Luna Sea (Arabian Sea); boss Leviathan (Carcharodon megalodon); reward 8,000;
 Tartarus Deep (Bermuda Triangle); boss Charybdis (Melanocetus); reward 10,000;
 Texcoco Great Lake (Amazon River); boss Ahuizotl (Elasmosaurus platyurus); reward 12,000;
 North Sea (Arctic Sea); boss Karkinos (Macrocheira kaempferi); reward 15,000;
 West Ocean (South Atlantic Ocean); boss Midgardsorm (Lumbricus terrestris gigantesque); reward 18,000;
 Panthalassa (Mediterranean Sea); final boss Rahab (Gigantopithecus thalassa cyclops); reward 20,000.

After defeating Rahab, during the credits Rahab reveals he was the one who created the sea monsters (except for Midgardsorm which must have existed before the events of this game) in order to protect the oceans from the pollution of the humans. He then warns the player that he will return someday.

Gameplay
The Ocean Hunter is played by using two mounted turret-like guns on the arcade cabinet. The game is capable of being played with either one or two people simultaneously. The player takes the role of an underwater adventurer searching for the Seven Great Monsters of the Seven Seas, hoping to collect the bounties placed on their heads for attacks on shipping vessels, humans and native marine life. The player proceeds to go throughout the game in a set path, shooting at various hostile ocean life along the way. The game is played progressing through various levels, each with its own design and layout, often incorporating the idea of sunken ships, underwater temples or cities of civilizations long gone. Upon reaching the end of the level, a boss is encountered. Each boss is named after a famous mythological sea monster with the final boss taking on different forms named Dagon, Poseidon, and Rahab (in the game he said he created all the bosses except Midgardsorm). There are also mini-bosses in the game which includes White Death, Sea Dragon, Sea Serpent, Hydra, Scylla, Naga, Medusa, Basilosaurus, Kerberos, Umi Bozu, Black Dragon, Vritra and Kaliya, many of them also named after sea monsters or mythological creatures.

Reception 
In Japan, Game Machine listed The Ocean Hunter on their 15 November 1998 issue as being the fifth most-successful dedicated arcade game of the month.

See also

 Let's Go Jungle!: Lost on the Island of Spice
 Transformers: Human Alliance
 Deadstorm Pirates
 Panic Museum

References

External links

1998 video games
Arcade video games
Arcade-only video games
Sega arcade games
Rail shooters
Video games developed in Japan
Cooperative video games